Queens is an unincorporated community in Upshur County, West Virginia, United States.

Etymology

The community was named after Armstead Charles Queen, the proprietor of a local mill.

References 

Unincorporated communities in West Virginia
Unincorporated communities in Upshur County, West Virginia